Navya (नव्या: youthful) may refer to :

Navya (TV series), an Indian television drama
Navya-Nyāya, view, system, or school of Indian logic and philosophy, founded in the 13th century
Navya movement, a school of writing in Kannada literature which originated in the 1950s
Navya SAS, a French manufacturer of driverless electric and robotic vehicles, based in Villeurbanne near Lyon

Given name
Navya Nair (born 1985), actress
Navya Natarajan, actress